Chris Haywood (born ) is an English-born Australian actor, writer and producer, with close to 500 screen performances to his name. Haywood has also worked as a casting director, art director, sound recordist, camera operator, gaffer, grip, location and unit manager.

Early life and education
Haywood was born around 1948 in Billericay, Essex, England. He spent his early childhood in Chelmsford before moving to High Wycombe in Buckinghamshire where he attended Royal Grammar School from 1959 to 1965. He then started working in the cellars of a local wine shipper before gaining a place at E15 Acting School. After graduating in 1970 he emigrated to Australia.

Career

Soon after arriving in Sydney, Haywood became involved with Sydney's Nimrod Theatre Company, helping to build the premises with scrap timber.

He was the Artistic Director of the Pros and Cons Playhouse at Parramatta Gaol from 1979 to 1981, and established the drama service on Kiribati National Radio.

His acting career encompasses roles in many films and television series.

Haywood is the Patron of the Friends of Waverley Library, where he inaugurated [[The Nib Waverley Library Award for Literature, now known as the Mark & Evette Moran Nib Literary Award. The prize is an annual award of $20,000 given for the quality of research for a published work of literary merit written by an Australian writer and published in the previous 12 months.

Haywood is now the Deputy Captain of VRA Hawkesbury and coxswain of their rescue boat. He is also currently working as a coxswain in the Australian pearling industry for Broken Bay Pearl Farm.

Television
TV credits as an actor include: Homicide, Essington, Against the Wind, Five Mile Creek, Return to Eden, Waterfront, A Good Thing Going, Boys From The Bush, Water Rats, Farscape, McLeod's Daughters, All Saints, Stingers, Grass Roots, Home and Away, The Last Confession of Alexander Pearce and The Pacific. Haywood appeared in Neighbours as Walter Mitchell in June 2013.

TV credits as a writer: Alvin Purple additional material (1976).

Personal life 

Haywood was married to actress, Wendy Hughes,  1980 and they had a child. They had met while filming Newsfront (1978), their relationship developed soon after. In April 1980 Haywood and Hughes portrayed "screen parents" in a childbirth film, For a Child Called Michael, shown to expecting parents at Royal Women's Hospital, Melbourne. The couple separated in 1982.

Awards
His performances have been honoured with three Awards from the Australian Film Institute (from a total of eight nominations) for his roles in the feature films A Street to Die  and Emerald City, and for television in Stingers as well as the Film Critics Circle of Australia Award for Kiss or Kill and the Asian Film Festival Award for In Search of Anna. He garnered three Logie Awards for his work on television-for Essington, Good Thing Going and Janus. He won the Best Actor award at the Tampa Bay Film Festival in Florida.

Filmography

Television Series

Films
{| class="wikitable"
|-
! Year !! Title !! Character !! Notes
|-
| 2022 || The Aussie Boys || align="center"| Jack || with Joe Klocek
|-
| 2021 || Love You Like That || align="center"| Bede || with John Jarratt
|-
| 2020 || Sweet River || align="center"| Nigel || with Martin Sacks
|-
| 2020 || Groundhog Night || align="center"| Ralph || Short
|-
| 2019 || Dirt Music || align="center"| Warwick || with Garrett Hedlund, David Wenham & Kelly Macdonald 
|-
| 2019 || The Projectionist || align="center"| Jack || Short
|-
| 2018 || Skewwhiff || align="center"| Bill || Short
|-
| 2017 || Third World Man || align="center"| Clinton Finch || Short
|-
| 2017 || Boar || align="center"| Jack || with John Jarratt, Steve Bisley & Ernie Dingo
|-
| 2017 || Australia Day || align="center"| Dr Ian Norris || with Bryan Brown
|-
| 2016 || The Dam || align="center" | Jack || Short
|-
| 2016 || Gangster Drag || align="center" | Jimmy || Short
|-
| 2015 || The Spa || align="center" | Don || Short
|-
| 2014 || Wedding of the Year || align="center" | Bede || with Maeve Dermody, Deborah Mailman, Colin Friels & Noni Hazlehurst
|-
| 2014 || The Bugle's Call || rowspan="1" align="center"| Bluebroker || Short
|-
| 2014 || Love is Now || rowspan="1" align="center"| Ben || with Eamon Farren, Anna Torv & Rodger Corser
|-
| 2013 || Return to Nim's Island || rowspan="1" align="center"| Grant || with Bindi Irwin, Toby Wallace, John Waters & Matthew Lillard
|-
| 2013 || Spirit Harbour || align="center" | Cyril || Short
|-
| 2013 || The Interviewer || align="center" | Paul Dexter || Short
|-
| 2012 || Almayer’s Folly || align="center" | Captain Ford ||
|-
| 2012 || Dangerous Remedy || align="center" | Sir Arthur Rylah || TV movie - with Susie Porter, Jeremy Sims, Peter O'Brien & Gary Sweet
|-
| 2011 || Swerve || align="center" | Armstrong || with Emma Booth,  Vince Colosimo, Roy Billing & Robert Mammone
|-
| 2011 || Busong: Palawan Fate || align="center" | Landowner || 
|-
| 2011 || Sleeping Beauty || align="center" | Man || with Rachael Blake, Emily Browning & Michael Dorman
|-
| 2010 || Savages Crossing || align="center" | Chris || with Sacha Horler, John Jarratt, Craig McLachlan & Jessica Napier
|-
| 2010 || Beneath Hill 60 || align="center" | Colonel Wilson Rutledge || with Brendan Cowell, Aden Young, Gyton Grantley & Anthony Hayes
|-
| 2009 || The Boys Are Back || align="center" | Tom || with Clive Owen, Emma Booth, Erik Thomson & Emma Lung
|-
| 2009 || False Witness || align="center" | Browning || TV movie-  with Dougray Scott, Richard Roxburgh, Don Hany & Stephen Curry
|-
| 2009 || Correspondence || align="center" | Quentin Samuels || Short
|-
| 2008 || The Last Confession of Alexander Pearce || align="center" | Robert Knopwood || with Adrian Dunbar, Don Hany & Dan Wyllie
|-
| 2008 || The View from Greenhaven || align="center" | Dashiell || with Steve Bisley & Wendy Hughes
|-
| 2008 || Salvation || align="center" | Architect || with Wendy Hughes & Kim Gyngell
|-
| 2008 || A Pretty Penny || align="center" | Jack || Short - with Max Cullen
|-
| 2008 || The Weight of Sunken Treasure || align="center" | Michael Dooley || Short - with Michael Dorman
|-
| 2008 || You Better Watch Out || align="center" | Santa || Short - with Dan Wyllie & Stephen Curry
|-
| 2007 || The Tank || align="center" | - || Short
|-
| 2007 || Swing || align="center" | Mr Doyle || Short
|-
| 2006 || Solo || align="center" | Arkan || with Vince Colosimo & Colin Friels
|-
| 2006 || Vend || align="center" | Mechanic 1 || Short
|-
| 2006 || The Water Diary || align="center" | Lunch Guest || Short - with Alice Englert & Justine Clarke
|-
| 2006 || Jindabyne || align="center" | Gregory || with Gabriel Byrne, Laura Linney, John Howard & Deborra-Lee Furness, Max Cullen
|-
| 2006 || Hotel Vladivostok || align="center" | Man || Short
|-
| 2005 || Jewboy || align="center" | Sam || with Saskia Burmeister & Ewen Leslie
|-
| 2005 || Adrift || align="center" | Albert || Short
|-
| 2004 || Through My Eyes || align="center" | Des Sturgess Q.C. || Miniseries - with Miranda Otto, Craig McLachlan, Peter O'Brien, Grant Bowler & Nadine Garner 
|-
| 2004 || BlackJack: Sweet Science || align="center" | Wayne Tippet || with Colin Friels, Vince Colosimo, Alex O'Loughlin, Anthony Hayes & Nash Edgerton
|-
| 2004 || The Widower || align="center" | Neville || with Tony Barry
|-
| 2004 || Salem’s Lot || align="center" | Uncredited || with Rob Lowe, Donald Sutherland, Robert Mammone & Brendan Cowell 
|-
| 2004 || Human Touch || align="center" | Edward || with Jacqueline McKenzie & Aden Young
|-
| 2003 || Lennie Cahill Shoots Through || align="center" | Twink || with Tony Barry, Diana Glenn
|-
| 2003 || Paradise Found || rowspan="1" align="center"| Charles Arnaud || with Kiefer Sutherland, Nastassja Kinski & Nicholas Hope
|-
| 2003 || Subterano || rowspan="1" align="center"| Cleary || with Alex Dimitriades, Tasma Walton & Alison Whyte
|-
| 2002 || Stuffed Bunny || rowspan="1" align="center"| Father of Marcus || Short - with Ryan Johnson, Michael Dorman, Marshall Napier & Jessica Napier
|-
| 2002 || The Nugget || align="center" | Doug || with Eric Bana, Stephen Curry, Belinda Emmett, Vince Colosimo & Max Cullen
|-
| 2002 || Black and White || rowspan="1" align="center"| Detective Sergeant Karskens || with Robert Carlyle, Colin Friels, Ben Mendelsohn & Roy Billing
|-
| 2001 || My Husband My Killer || align="center" | George Cannellis || TV movie - with Colin Friels, Craig McLachlan & Tara Morice
|-
| 2001 || The Day of the Roses || rowspan="1" align="center"| Informant || Mniseries - with Paul Mercurio, Stephen Curry Rebecca Gibney & Peter O'Brien
|-
| 2001 || The Diaries of Vaslav Nijinsky || rowspan="1" align="center"| Oscar || with Derek Jacobi
|-
| 2001 || One Night the Moon || rowspan="1" align="center"| Sergeant || with Paul Kelly & David Field
|-
| 2000 || The Monkey's Mask || align="center"| Dad Fitzpatrick || with Marton Csokas, Susie Porter & Brendan Cowell
|-
| 2000 || Innocence || rowspan="1" align="center"| Minister || with Julia Blake & Robert Menzies
|-
| 2000 || Muggers || align="center"| George Roy Rogers || with Jason Barry, Matt Day & Marshall Napier
|-
| 1999 || Molokai: The Story of Father Damien || rowspan="1" align="center"| Clayton Strawn || with David Wenham, Derek Jacobi, Sam Neill, Peter O'Toole, Tom Wilkinson & Aden Young
|-
| 1999 || Change of Heart || rowspan="1" align="center"| Harry || with Tony Barry & Grant Bowler
|-
| 1997 || Oscar and Lucinda || rowspan="1" align="center"| Mr. Judd || with Ralph Fiennes, Cate Blanchett, Tom Wilkinson, Richard Roxburgh & Geoffrey Rush
|-
| 1997 || Fable || rowspan="1" align="center"| Flagg || TV movie - with Simon Westaway & Melissa George
|-
| 1997 || Blackrock || rowspan="1" align="center"| Detective Sergeant Wilansky || with Simon Lyndon, Justine Clarke, Essie Davis, John Howard & Heath Ledger
|-
| 1997 || Kiss or Kill || rowspan="1" align="center"| Detective Hummer || with Frances O'Connor, Matt Day, Barry Otto & Max Cullen
|-
| 1997 || One Way Ticket || rowspan="1" align="center"| Bertie || with Peter Phelps, Rachel Blakely & Jane Hall
|-
| 1996 || Lust and Revenge || rowspan="1" align="center"| George Oliphant || with Nicholas Hope, Claudia Karvan & Wendy Hughes
|-
| 1996 || Shine || align="center" | Sam || with Geoffrey Rush & Noah Taylor
|-
| 1996 || Cabbie of the Year || rowspan="1" align="center"| - || Short
|-
| 1995 || Singapore Sling: Old Flames || rowspan="1" align="center"| Sonny || with John Waters & Ray Barrett
|-
| 1994 || Muriel's Wedding || rowspan="1" align="center"| Ken Blundell || with Toni Collette, Dan Wyllie, Rachel Griffiths, Bill Hunter, Jeanie Drynan, Sophie Lee, Daniel Lapaine, Pippa Grandison & Matt Day
|-
| 1994 || Exile || rowspan="1" align="center"| Sacerdote || with Aden Young, Claudia Karvan, Barry Otto & Hugo Weaving
|-
| 1994 || Bernie's Magic Moment || rowspan="1" align="center"| Bernie || Short
|-
| 1993 || The Feds: Betrayal || rowspan="1" align="center"| Daniel "Mac" McIntyre || with Robert Taylor & Peter Phelps
|-
| 1993 || Touch Me || rowspan="1" align="center"| Claude || Short - with Claudia Karvan, Barry Otto & David Field
|-
| 1992 || Alex || rowspan="1" align="center"| Mr. Jack || with Cathy Godbold
|-
| 1992 || The Nun and the Bandit || rowspan="1" align="center"| Michael Stanley || with Norman Kaye, Tony Llewellyn-Jones & Robert Menzies
|-
| 1992 || The Last Man Hanged || rowspan="1" align="center"| Sheriff || TV movie with Colin Friels & Angie Milliken
|-
| 1991 || A Woman's Tale || rowspan="1" align="center"| Jonathan || with Gosia Dobrowolska, Norman Kaye, Max Gillies & Tony Llewellyn-Jones
|-
| 1991 || Sweet Talker || rowspan="1" align="center"| Gerald Bostock || with Bryan Brown, Karen Allen, Justin Rosniak & Bruce Spence
|-
| 1990 || Quigley Down Under || align="center"| Major Ashley-Pitt || with Tom Selleck, Alan Rickman & Ben Mendelsohn
|-
| 1990 || Aya || rowspan="1" align="center"| Mac || with Nicholas Eadie
|-
| 1990 || Golden Braid || rowspan="1" align="center"| Bernard || with Norman Kaye & Robert Menzies
|-
| 1990 || Call Me Mr. Brown || rowspan="1" align="center"| Peter Macari || with Bill Hunter, John Polson & Max Cullen
|-
| 1990 || Plead Guilty, Get a Bond || rowspan="1" align="center"| - || Short
|-
| 1989 || Island || rowspan="1" align="center"| Janis || with Irene Papas & Norman Kaye
|-
| 1988 || Emerald City || rowspan="1" align="center"| Mike McCord || with Nicole Kidman, Robyn Nevin & Nicholas Hammond
|-
| 1988 || The Navigator: A Medieval Odyssey || rowspan="1" align="center"| Arno || with Marshall Napier
|-
| 1988 || Manifesto || rowspan="1" align="center"| Wango || with Alfred Molina, Simon Callow & Gabrielle Anwar
|-
| 1988 || Warm Nights on a Slow Moving Train || rowspan="1" align="center"| Stationmaster || with Wendy Hughes, Colin Friels & Norman Kaye
|-
| 1988 || A Day and a Half || rowspan="1" align="center"| - || Short - with Renée Geyer
|-
| 1988 || The First Kangaroos || rowspan="1" align="center"| James Giltinan || with Dennis Waterman
|-
| 1987 || The Tale of Ruby Rose || rowspan="1" align="center"| Henry Rose || with Sheila Florance
|-
| 1987 || Don Quixote of La Mancha || rowspan="1" align="center"| Voice || TV movie
|-
| 1987 || The Bit Part || rowspan="1" align="center"| Michael Thornton || with John Wood, Nicole Kidman & Deborra-Lee Furness
|-
| 1986 || Dogs in Space || rowspan="1" align="center"| Man || with Michael Hutchence
|-
| 1986 || Malcolm || rowspan="1" align="center"| Willy || with Colin Friels & Bud Tingwell
|-
| 1986 || King Solomon's Mines || rowspan="1" align="center"| Voice || with Tom Burlinson & John Meillon
|-
| 1986 || Double Sculls || rowspan="1" align="center"| Paul Weber || with John Hargreaves
|-
| 1985 || Burke & Wills || rowspan="1" align="center"| Tom McDonagh || with Jack Thompson & Greta Scacchi
|-
| 1985 || Wills & Burke || rowspan="1" align="center"| Constable || Spoof film
|-
| 1985 || A Street to Die || rowspan="1" align="center"| Col Turner || with Brett Climo
|-
| 1985 || The Coca-Cola Kid || rowspan="1" align="center"| Kim || with Eric Roberts, Greta Scacchi, Kris McQuade & Tony Barry
|-
| 1984 || Strikebound || align="center" | Wattie Doig || with John Howard & Hugh Keays-Byrne
|-
| 1984 || Razorback || align="center" | Benny Baker || with Bill Kerr, John Howard & Judy Morris
|-
| 1984 || The Great Gold Swindle || align="center" | Peter Duvnjak || with John Hargreaves
|-
| 1983 || The Return of Captain Invincible || align="center" | Maitre D' || with Alan Arkin, Christopher Lee, Bill Hunter & Max Cullen
|-
| 1983 || Man of Flowers || align="center" | David || with Norman Kaye, Julia Blake & Werner Herzog
|-
| 1982 || Lonely Hearts || align="center" | Detective || with Wendy Hughes, Norman Kaye, Julia Blake & Kris McQuade
|-
| 1982 || The Clinic || align="center" | Dr. Eric Linden || with Simon Burke & Rona McLeod
|-
| 1982 || Running on Empty || align="center" | Fotógrafo || with Max Cullen & Penne Hackforth-Jones
|-
| 1982 || The Man from Snowy River || align="center" | Curly || with Kirk Douglas, Sigrid Thornton & Jack Thompson
|-
| 1982 || Heatwave || align="center" | Peter Houseman || with Judy Davis, Bill Hunter & John Meillon
|-
| 1982 || Attack Force Z || align="center" | "Sparrer" Bird || with Mel Gibson, Sam Neill & John Waters
|-
| 1982 || With Prejudice || align="center" | Rogerson || with Max Cullen & Tony Barry
|-
| 1982 || Freedom || align="center" | Phil || with Bud Tingwell & Max Cullen
|-
| 1981 || Wrong Side of the Road || rowspan="1" align="center"| Policeman ||
|-
| 1981 || Maybe This Time || align="center" | The Salesman || with Judy Morris & Bill Hunter
|-
| 1980 || Breaker Morant || align="center" | Corporal Sharp || with Edward Woodward, John Waters, Bryan Brown & Ray Meagher
|-
| 1980 || Dead Man's Float || align="center" | Thug || with Bill Hunter & Gus Mercurio
|-
| 1979 || Kostas || align="center" | Martin || with Wendy Hughes, Kris McQuade, Graeme Blundell & Norman Kaye
|-
| 1978 || In Search of Anna || align="center" | Jerry || with Judy Morris & Bill Hunter
|-
| 1978 || Newsfront || align="center" | Chris Hewitt || with Bill Hunter, Wendy Hughes & Bryan Brown
|-
| 1978 || A Good Thing Going || align="center" | Terry || TV movie - with Miles Buchanan, Beth Buchanan & Simone Buchanan
|-
| 1977 || Out of It || align="center" | Warren || with Terry Camilleri
|-
| 1976 || Deathcheaters || align="center" | Carnicero || with John Hargreaves
|-
| 1976 || The Trespassers || align="center" | Sandy || with Judy Morris  & Max Gillies
|-
| 1975 || Ivanhoe || align="center" | Voice || TV movie
|-
| 1975 || The Removalists || align="center"| Rob || with Jacki Weaver
|-
| 1975 || The Great Macarthy || rowspan="1" align="center"| Warburton || with Judy Morris, Barry Humphries, Max Gillies & John Jarratt
|-
| 1974 || The Cars That Ate Paris || rowspan="1" align="center"| Darryl || with John Meillon, Terry Camilleri, Max Gillies & Bruce Spence
|-
| 1974 || Essington || rowspan="1" align="center"| Squires || TV movie - with Cornelia Frances & Drew Forsythe
|-
| 1972 || The Money Game || rowspan="1" align="center"| The Worker (voice) || TV movie
|}

 Producer & Writer:'''Theatre

Film credits as an Art Director: Force of Destiny (2015)

Film credit as Casting Director: The Crater (2015)

Film credit as Producer: The Media Project'' directed by Peter Watkins (1991)

References

External links
 
 

1948 births
Australian art directors
Best Actor AACTA Award winners
Australian casting directors
English male film actors
English male television actors
Living people
Logie Award winners
People educated at the Royal Grammar School, High Wycombe
Male actors from Essex
British casting directors